Bloody is an intensifier in British English, often used in such phrases as "bloody Hell" or "bloody murder". 
Bloody may also refer to:
 The adjective of blood

Places
 Bloody Bay, the site of a 15th-century Scottish naval battle - see Battle of Bloody Bay
 Bloody Canyon, California, United States
 Bloody Falls, a waterfall in Nunavut, Canada
 Bloody Lake, Minnesota, United States

People
 William T. Anderson ((1840–1864), pro-Confederate guerrilla leader during the American Civil War known as "Bloody Bill"
 Bloody Benders, a family of serial killers who lived and operated in Labette County, Kansas from 1871 to 1873
 Bloody Bill Cunningham (1756–1787), American loyalist infamous for perpetrating a series of bloody massacres during the American Revolutionary War
 Mary I of England (1516–1558), Roman Catholic Queen of England and Ireland, called "Bloody Mary" by her Protestant enemies
 Nicholas II of Russia (1868–1918), last Czar of Russia, nicknamed "Nicholas the Bloody" by his enemies
 Banastre Tarleton (1754–1833), British officer in the American Revolutionary War known as "Bloody Ban"

Arts, entertainment, and media
 "Bloody" (song), a song by Five Finger Death Punch on their 2018 album And Justice for None
 Bloody Bloody Andrew Jackson, a musical
 Bloody Disgusting, an American horror genre website, and film distributor and producer
 Bloody Roar, a series of fighting games created by Hudson Soft, and developed together with Eighting
 "Bloody Well Right", a song by the progressive rockband Supertramp from their 1974 album Crime of the Century

Other uses
 Bloodybelly comb jelly, the sole species in the genus Lampocteis cruentiventer

See also
 Bloody Mary (disambiguation)
 Bloody Sunday (disambiguation)